Alibeg,
also spelt Ali Beg and Ali Baig, previously called  Kirtan Ghar (/),  is a village in the Bhimber District of Azad Kashmir, Pakistan.  It is on the bank of the Upper Jhelum Canal.
It is the seventh-largest village of Azad Kashmir with a population of almost five thousand people. Most of the people are educated in the village.

History
The village was earlier known as Kirtan Ghar under the name of a Sikh gurudwara in the area. There was also a Khalsa Middle School (/), which was mainly run by Sant Baba Sunder Singh Ji. students from nearby villages such as Dina, Gora Nakka, Kalri, Kamotra, Jhelum, Kotla,  Chachiya etc. came to seek knowledge. And the languages taught in the school were Persian, Urdu, Punjabi, English etc. Before the partition of 1947, the main communities that lived there are Hindus, Sikhs and Muslims and they engaged in agriculture and pastoralism.
Presently, Arain Families populate the Ali Baig village.

Economy 
People in the village grow wheat, maize, barley, pulses, sugarcane and other vegetables.

Alibaig has several private schools.

Demographics 
The native language is Pothwari.

Notable people 
 Sub. (Retired) Raj Muhammad (Historian appeared on several TV shows. He is also featured in the book The Quest Continues: Lost Heritage : the Sikh Legacy in Pakistan.)
 Chaudhry Muhammad Sarwar Mehar (late) (Retired) Superintendent of Azad Kashmir   
 Professor Riaz Akhtar (late) (Former Principal Education College Afazalpur, Mirpur AJK)
Prof.Dr.Shafiq Anjum (Professor of Urdu, NUML Islamabad)
 Sep.Muhammad Yaqoob Shaheed (Martyred in 1999 Karghal Sector)

References

Bibliography

External links
 
 
 Nasir Mahmood, Ali Baig Gurdwara - ruins, Tripadvisor, January 2017

Populated places in Bhimber District